Cameroonian literature is literature from Cameroon, which includes literature in French, English and indigenous languages.

Overview

Colonial-era writers such as Louis-Marie Pouka and Sankie Maimo were educated by European missionary societies and advocated assimilation into European culture as the means to bring Cameroon into the modern world. Jean-Louis Njemba Medu was a pioneering writer who published the science fiction novel Nnanga Kon in the Bulu language as early as 1932. After World War II, writers such as Mongo Beti and Ferdinand Oyono analysed and criticised colonialism and rejected assimilation. Other older generation writers include Guillaume Oyônô Mbia, Mbella Sonne Dipoko, Francis Bebey, René Philombé and kenjo Jumbam.

Some critically acclaimed writers include Marcien Towa, Imbolo Mbue, Patrice Nganang, Calixthe Beyala, Bate Besong, Gaston-Paul Effa, Werewere Liking, Ba'bila Mutia, John Nkemngong Nkengasong, Bole Butake, Leonora Miano, Francis B Nyamnjoh and Linus T. Asong.

In 2014, Imbolo Mbue signed a million dollar deal with Random House for her debut manuscript. The novel titled Behold the Dreamers follows the travails of a Cameroonian immigrant and a Lehman Brothers executive during the 2008 financial crisis.

Literary awards
International and bilingual English-and-French literary prizes, Grand Prix of Literary Associations (GPLA), were launched in Cameroon in 2013, and are to date the main literary awards in Cameroon. They have already contributed to unveil or confirm many gifted authors, such as Eric Mendi, twice winner in the Belles-Lettres Category, Charles Salé, Fiston Mwanza Mujila, Felwine Sarr, to name a few. The GPLA also pay tribute to deceased authors through the Grand prix de la mémoire, which was awarded to late Cameroonian author Sankie Maimo in the last edition (GPLA 2016).

See also

 Grand Prix of Literary Associations
 List of Cameroonian writers
 Media of Cameroon

Footnotes

References and further reading
 Pierre Fandio, La littérature camerounaise dans le champ social : grandeurs, misères et défis, l'Harmattan, Paris, Budapest, Kinshasa, 2006, 244 p. 
 Pierre Fandio, Les lieux incertains du champ littéraire camerounais : la postcolonie à partir de la marge, l'Harmattan, Paris, 2012, 273 p.
Shadrack Ambanasom, Education of the Deprived: A Study of Four Cameroonian Playwrights. Yaounde: Yaounde University Press, 2003.
Shadrack Ambanasom, The Cameroon Novel of English Expression: An Introduction. Bamenda; Agwecam, 2007.
Hilarious Ambe, Change Aesthetics in Anglophone Cameroon Drama and Theatre.Bayreuth African Studies 2007.
Joyce B Ashuntantang, Landscaping Postcoloniality:The Dissemination of Cameroon Anglophone Literature. Bamenda; Langaa RPCIG, 2009.
Oscar C Labang, ImagiNation:Theorizing the Nation in Postcolonial Anglophone Cameroon Poetry. Yaounde; Miraclaire Academic Publications, 2012.

External links
Cameroon Literature in English – Vibrant but Invisible
An Overview of Cameroon Prison Literature from Albert Mukong to Titus Edzoa